The Indian Police Foundation and Institute is a New Delhi based research organization, seeks to bring the police and the citizen stakeholders together, to collectively work for improving the professional, ethical and the service delivery standards of the police.

Its subsidiary, the Indian Police Institute is a professional home for the Indian Police, providing a vibrant platform dedicated to applied research, ideas generation, standards- setting, capacity building and evidence-based policing. While a good deal of work in this direction is already being done at the field level by several individual police officers and institutions, there has been a felt need for an independent intellectual forum for research and free flow of ideas, to supplement the efforts already under way, to support the Indian police to cope with the complex problems of policing in a fast-changing world.

The Indian Police Foundation is a response to the groundswell of public demand for an efficient, accountable and people-centric police that functions impartially, respects human dignity and human rights and steadfastly upholds the Rule of Law in all situations. The Foundation believes that a robust Criminal Justice System supported by a professional police force should be an important pillar of the idea of a resurgent and modern India.

The Indian Police Foundation and Institute believes that transformative reforms are possible through appropriate interventions in skill building and attitudinal training, through reforms that are both bold and practical, and through collective action of all stakeholders – the governments, the police, the private sector as well as the civil society, to drive a nationwide campaign for strengthening our grassroots level policing institutions.

The Indian Police Foundation is led by an eminent, multi-disciplinary Board, which is responsible for the governance of the Society, providing visionary leadership and providing strategic guidance to its policies, as well as interfacing with government agencies and leading the policy advocacy. Prakash Singh, a former IPS officer and Chairman of the Foundation is well known for his persistent and crusading efforts aimed at police reform. Mr. N.Ramachandran, a former DG of Police, is the Founder and President of the Indian Police Foundation. Indian Police Foundation and Institute was inaugurated on 21 October 2015 by United Home Minister Rajnath Singh.

On 14 Dec 2015, it entered into an association with Gujarat Forensic Sciences University, Gandhinagar (which is the world's first university solely dedicated to Forensic & Investigative Science).

See also

 Crime reporting and tracking
 Bureau of Police Research and Development (BPRD)
 Call 112
 Criminal record
 Crime and Criminal Tracking Network and Systems (CCTNS)
 Law enforcement in India
 National Crime Records Bureau (NCRB)
 Sex offender registry (SOR)
 United Nations Office on Drugs and Crime (UNODC)
 Other police related
 Sardar Vallabhbhai Patel National Police Academy
 Ministry of Home Affairs (India)
Police Foundation (UK)
Police Foundation of USA

References

External links
Official Website

Think tanks based in India
Research institutes in Delhi
Organisations based in Delhi